Coldwater Township is a township in Comanche County, Kansas, USA.  As of the 2000 census, its population was 1,086.

Geography
According to the USGS, it contains two cemeteries: Crown Hill and Nescatunga.

The streams of Cave Creek, Cottonwood Creek, Dog Creek, East Branch Nescatunga Creek, Horse Creek, Indian Creek, Jug Motte Creek, Mustang Creek, Nescatunga Creek, Owl Creek, Red Fork Creek, Sand Creek, Sheele Creek, Walnut Creek, West Branch Nescatunga Creek, West Creek, Widow Creek and Wildcat Creek run through this township.

Transportation
Coldwater Township contains one airport or landing strip, Stark Airport.

References
 USGS Geographic Names Information System (GNIS)

External links
 US-Counties.com
 City-Data.com

Townships in Comanche County, Kansas
Townships in Kansas